Jayu Laqhi (Aymara jayu salt, laqhi gorge, precipice, "salt gorge (or cliff)", hispanicized spelling Jayulaque) is a mountain in the Andes of Peru, about  high. It is located in the Arequipa Region, Caylloma Province, Chuca District, and in the Puno Region, Lampa Province, Santa Lucía District.

References 

Mountains of Peru
Mountains of Arequipa Region
Mountains of Puno Region